The 2020 Summer Olympic football gold medal match was a football match to determine the gold medal winners of men's football tournament at the 2020 Summer Olympics. The match was the 25th final of the men's football tournament at the Olympics, a quadrennial tournament contested by the men's national teams of the member associations of FIFA to decide the Olympic champions. The match was held at International Stadium Yokohama in Yokohama, Japan, on 7 August 2021. It was played between the defending champions Brazil and Spain.

Background 
Since the Olympic men's football was restricted to an under-23 tournament in 1992, Brazil had played in two gold medal matches, losing to Mexico in 2012 before prevailing at home in 2016. Spain also had played twice in such occasion, winning in 1992 – also when they hosted the Olympics – and losing to Cameroon in 2000.

Albeit this was the first meeting between Brazil and Spain at the Olympic gold medal match, their senior and age-group teams had met in many finals before. The senior met in the 2013 FIFA Confederations Cup Final, in which Brazil beat the then-world champions 3–0. The two countries also met in the 1985 and 2003 FIFA World Youth Championships, as well as the final of the 2003 FIFA U-17 World Championship; Brazil won in all occasions.

Venue

The final was held at the International Stadium Yokohama in Yokohama, located in the Kanagawa Prefecture.

The stadium had hosted numerous international sporting events. It hosted a semi-final and the final of the 2001 FIFA Confederations Cup, as well as three matches of the 2002 FIFA World Cup including the final; Brazil's senior team won the latter.

Referee
The referee in charge of the match was Australian Chris Beath, a native of Queensland, who had officiated two previous matches in the tournament; Group A match between Mexico and France and quarter final match between Brazil and Egypt. Breath had two assistant linesmen also from Australia.

Route to the final

Match

Details

Post-match
Following the final, Brazil became only the fifth team to retain the Olympic title in men's football, after Great Britain, Uruguay, Hungary, and Argentina. In winning the tournament, Brazil's captain Dani Alves extended his own record of being the most decorated footballer in history with a breath-taking 43 career team honours.

Notes

References

Football at the 2020 Summer Olympics – Men's tournament